A list of most notable Dutch politicians, party affiliation given.

A
Willem Aantjes - ARP / CDA
Gijs van Aardenne - VVD
Jan van Aartsen - VVD
Jozias van Aartsen - VVD
Ahmed Aboutaleb - PvdA
Karin Adelmund - PvdA
Fleur Agema - LPF - PVV
Dries van Agt - CDA
Nebahat Albayrak - PvdA
Wim Albeda - ARP / CDA
Guus Albregts - KVP
Hans Alders - PvdA
Marius van Amelsvoort - KVP / CDA
Hedy d'Ancona - PvdA
Frans Andriessen - KVP
Koos Andriessen - CHU / CDA
Johannes Regnerus Maria van Angeren - RKSP
Ed Anker - GPV / ChristenUnie
Haijo Apotheker - D66
Charlie Aptroot - VVD
Agnes van Ardenne - CDA
Khadija Arib - PvdA
Chris Arlman - PvdA
Filip van As - RPF / ChristenUnie
Lodewijk Asscher - PvdA
Joop Atsma - CDA
Farid Azarkan - DENK
Malik Azmani - VVD
Naïma Azough - GroenLinks

B
Hans van Baalen - VVD
Joep Baartmans-van den Boogaart - PvdA
Jan Baas - PvdA
Joop Bakker - ARP / CDA
Marcus Bakker - CPN
Jan Peter Balkenende - CDA
Jan Bank - PvdA
Marleen Barth - PvdA
Farshad Bashir - SP
Rob Bats - VVD
Thierry Baudet - FVD
Ria Beckers - PPR / GroenLinks
Relus ter Beek - PvdA
Willibrord van Beek - VVD
Louis Beel - RKSP / KVP
Frans Beelaerts van Blokland - CHU
Albert Christiaan Willem Beerman - CHU
Henk Beernink - CHU
Harm Beertema - PVV
Jan Beijert - PvdA
Marten Beinema - ARP / CDA
Piet de Bekker
Bas Belder - SGP
Jhim van Bemmel - PVV - no party affiliation
Roland van Benthem - VVD
Mohammed Benzakour - PvdA
Gert van den Berg - SGP
Niels van den Berge - GroenLinks
George van den Bergh - SDAP / PvdA
Vera Bergkamp - D66
Harald Bergmann - VVD
Simon Berman
Thijs Berman - PvdA
Magda Berndsen - D66
Anthonij Ewoud Jan Bertling
Ino van den Besselaar - PVV
Marijke van Beukering - D66
Jean Gustave Stanislas Bevers - RKSP
Barryl Biekman - D66
Barend Biesheuvel - ARP
Marja van Bijsterveldt - CDA
Mirjam Bikker - ChristenUnie
Suzanne Bischoff van Heemskerck - D66
Jack Biskop - CDA
Roelof Bisschop - SGP
Elly Blanksma-van den Heuvel - CDA
Henk Bleker - CDA
Leo de Block - KVP
Jacobus Cornelis Bloem
Stef Blok - VVD
Peter Blokhuis - ChristenUnie
Hans Blokland - GPV / ChristenUnie
Bas Jan van Bochove - CDA
Hendrik van Boeijen - CHU
Arend Jan Boekestijn - VVD
Emanuel Boekman - SDAP
Ad de Boer - RPF / ChristenUnie
Betty de Boer - VVD
Hans de Boer - ARP / CDA
Margreeth de Boer - PvdA
Remmelt de Boer - GPV / ChristenUnie
Roelf de Boer - LPF
Jaap Boersma - ARP / CDA - PvdA
Kees Boertien - ARP / CDA
Pieter Bogaers - KVP - PPR
Frits Bolkestein - VVD
Gerrit Bolkestein - VDB
Eduard Bomhoff - PvdA - LPF
Harry van Bommel - SP
Désirée Bonis - PvdA
Gerardus Petrus Booms - liberaal
Louis Bontes - PVV
Elise Boot - CDA - God Met Ons - AOV - LPF - PFC
Jim de Booy - independent liberaal
Els Borst - D66
Bob van den Bos - D66
Frederik Bos - Plattelandersbond, Neutrale fractie
Wouter Bos - PvdA
Johannes Adrianus van den Bosch
Martin Bosma - PVV
André Bosman - VVD
Ben Bot - CDA
Piet Boukema - ARP / CDA
Lea Bouwmeester - PvdA
Theo Bovens - CDA
Roger van Boxtel - D66
Emine Bozkurt - PvdA
Bruno Braakhuis - PvdA - GroenLinks
Gerrit Braks - CDA
Johan Brautigam - Vrije Socialisten - SDAP / PvdA
Johannes Roelof Maria van den Brink - KVP
Patrick van den Brink - CDA
Laurens Jan Brinkhorst - D66
Elco Brinkman - CDA
Hero Brinkman - PVV - OBP / DPK
Lodewijk Gerard Brocx
Hans van den Broek - KVP / CDA
Johannes van den Broek - liberaal
Han ten Broeke - VVD
Gerrit Brokx - KVP / CDA

Ina Brouwer - CPN / GroenLinks
Tiemen Brouwer - KVP
Cees van Bruchem - RPF / ChristenUnie
Justinus van der Brugghen - Antirevolutionair
Jan Anthonie Bruijn - VVD
Hanke Bruins Slot - CDA
Paul van Buitenen - Agalev - SP - Europa Transparant - no party affiliation
Kathalijne Buitenweg - GroenLinks
Piet Bukman - CDA
Ieke van den Burg - PvdA
Brigitte van der Burg - VVD
Eric van der Burg - VVD
Jaap Burger - SDAP / PvdA
Don Burgers - KVP / CDA
Desirée Brouwer-de Geus - CDA
Jo Cals - KVP
Ingrid de Caluwé - VVD
Wim van de Camp - KVP / CDA
Yasemin Çegerek - PvdA
Metin Çelik - PvdA
Job Cohen - PvdA
Hendrikus Colijn - ARP
Karina Content - PvdA - no party affiliation
Wim Cool - D66
Dorette Corbey - PvdA
Marije Cornelissen - GroenLinks
Clemens Cornielje - VVD
Pieter Cort van der Linden - liberalisme
Coşkun Çörüz - CDA
Ernst Cramer - GPV / ChristenUnie
Jacqueline Cramer - PvdA
Jan Cremers - PvdA

D
Peter van Dalen - RPF / ChristenUnie
Ien Dales - PvdA
Marcel van Dam - PvdA - no party affiliation
Laurens Dassen - Volt
Dick Dees - VVD
Wim Deetman - CDA
Tjeerd van Dekken - PvdA
Sander Dekker - VVD
Sybilla Dekker - VVD
Ineke Dezentjé Hamming-Bluemink - VVD
Tofik Dibi - GroenLinks
Teun van Dijck - PVV
Diederik van Dijk - SGP
Jasper van Dijk - SP
Kees van Dijk - CHU / CDA
Otwin van Dijk - PvdA
Leen van Dijke - RPF / ChristenUnie
Elbert Dijkgraaf - SGP
Klaas Dijkhoff - VVD
Sharon Dijksma - PvdA
Hans Dijkstal - VVD
Pia Dijkstra - D66
Remco Dijkstra - VVD
Jeroen Dijsselbloem - PvdA
Adriaan Dijxhoorn - no party affiliation
Wim Dik - D66
Carla Dik-Faber - ChristenUnie
Sjoera Dikkers - PvdA
Willie Dille - PVV
Boris Dittrich - D66
Anneke van Dok-van Weele - PvdA
Dick Dolman - PvdA
Ferdinand Domela Nieuwenhuis - SDB
Rianne Donders-de Leest - CDA
Wim van de Donk - CDA
Leendert Antonie Donker - SDAP / PvdA
Dirk Donker Curtius
Jan Donner - ARP
Piet Hein Donner - CDA
Bert Doorn - CDA
Harry van Doorn - KVP
Willem Drees - PvdA
Willem Drees jr. - SDAP / PvdA - DS70
Johan Driessen - PVV
Pieter Duisenberg - VVD
Wim Duisenberg - PvdA
Hendrik Jan van Duren - CHU - Boerenpartij

E
Wim van Eekelen - VVD
Bas Eenhoorn - VVD
Joost Eerdmans - CDA - LPF - no party affiliation - Eén NL - FVD - JA21
Bas Eickhout - GroenLinks
Angelien Eijsink - PvdA
Ton Elias - VVD
André Elissen - PVV
David van Embden - VDB / PvdA
Piet Engels - KVP
Ingrid van Engelshoven - D66
Adriaan Engelvaart
Andrée van Es - PSP / GroenLinks
Peter Ester - ChristenUnie
Camiel Eurlings - CDA

F
Geke Faber - PvdA
Marjolein Faber - PVV
Arjan El Fassed - GroenLinks
Hubert Fermina - D66
Kathleen Ferrier - CDA
Alexander Fiévez - KVP
Dirk Fock - Liberale Unie / LSP
Manon Fokke - PvdA
Herman Fokker - SGP
Luuk Folkerts - Partij voor de Dieren
Pim Fortuyn - LN - LPF
Sietse Fritsma - PVV
Johan Furstner

G
Bas de Gaay Fortman - PPR
Wilhelm Friedrich de Gaay Fortman - CDA
Til Gardeniers-Berendsen - KVP / CDA
Pieter van Geel - CDA
Dirk Jan de Geer - CHU
Molly Geertsema - VVD
Leonard Geluk - CDA
Karien van Gennip - CDA
Ineke van Gent - PSP / GroenLinks
Karen Gerbrands - PVV
Gerben-Jan Gerbrandy - D66
Pieter Gerbrandy - ARP
Henk van Gerven - SP
Sharon Gesthuizen - SP
Jaco Geurts - CDA
Aart Jan de Geus - CDA
Pieter de Geus - CHU / CDA
Daniël Théodore Gevers van Endegeest - Conservatief
Jos Gielen - KVP
Rosita van Gijlswijk - SP
Rob van Gijzel - PvdA
Leendert Ginjaar - VVD
Nell Ginjaar-Maas - VVD
Hans Gispen - ARP
Karel Anthonie Godin de Beaufort - ARP
Hendrik Goeman Borgesius - Liberale Unie
Louis Napoleon van der Goes van Dirxland - liberaal
Marinus van der Goes van Naters - SDAP / PvdA
Carel Goseling - RKSP
Lubertus Götzen - no party affiliation - ARP
Arie de Graaf - PvdA
Fred de Graaf - VVD
Machiel de Graaf - PVV
Thom de Graaf - D66
Dieuwke de Graaff-Nauta - CDA
Andries Cornelis Dirk de Graeff - liberaal
Rik Grashoff - GroenLinks
Dion Graus - PVV
Frank de Grave - VVD
Laetitia Griffith - VVD
Willem Johan Lucas Grobbée - conservatief
Bert Groen - GPV / ChristenUnie
Els de Groen - Europa Transparant - no party affiliation
Suze Groeneweg - SDAP
Melis van de Groep - GPV / ChristenUnie
Ed Groot - PvdA
Jan de Groote - Boerenpartij
Hans Gruijters - VVD - D66
Sultan Günal-Gezer - PvdA

H
Liane den Haan - D66 - PvdA - 50+
Marijke van Haaren - CDA
Wassila Hachchi - D66
Sybrand van Haersma Buma - CDA
Wybren van Haga - VVD - no party affiliation - FVD
Floris Adriaan van Hall
Femke Halsema - GroenLinks
Boris van der Ham - D66
Mariëtte Hamer - PvdA
Mark Harbers - VVD
Jan Harte van Tecklenburg
Maarten Haverkamp - CDA
André Hazes - Ronde Venen Belang
Jan Heemskerk
Theo Heemskerk - ARP
Peter van Heemst - PvdA
Enneüs Heerma - ARP / CDA
Pieter Heerma - CDA
Arie Heijkoop - SDAP
Pierre Heijnen - PvdA
Johan Adriaan van der Heim van Duivendijke
Herman Heinsbroek - LPF
Lilian Helder - PVV
Gerardus Philippus Helders - CHU
Jan Hendrikx - CDA
Jeanine Hennis-Plasschaert - VVD
Eveline Herfkens - PvdA
Loek Hermans - VVD
Ad Hermes - KVP / CDA
Marcial Hernandez - PVV - independent
Adri van Heteren - SGP
Gerrit Jan van Heuven Goedhart - PvdA
Nina den Heyer - MPB
Theo Hiddema - FVD
Eddy van Hijum - CDA
Myrthe Hilkens - PvdA
Hans Hillen - CDA
Ernst Hirsch Ballin - CDA
Ayaan Hirsi Ali - VVD
Henk Hoekstra - CPN
Wopke Hoekstra - CDA
Onno Hoes - VVDd
Henk ten Hoeve - FNP, OSF
Maria van der Hoeven - CDA
Gerrit Holdijk - SGP
Michiel Holtackers - CDA
Hans Hoogervorst - PvdA - VVD
Duco Hoogland - PvdA
Jaap de Hoop Scheffer - CDA
Willem Hoornstra - CDA
Guusje ter Horst - PvdA
Frank Houben - KVP / CDA
Harm van Houten - ARP - CDU
Rinus Houtman - SGP
Jan van Houwelingen - ARP / CDA
Johan Houwers - VVD
Matthijs Huizing - VVD
Tineke Huizinga - RPF / ChristenUnie

I
Alexander Willem Frederik Idenburg -ARP
Els Iping - PvdA
Ewout Irrgang - SP

J
Hans s'Jacob - no party affiliation
Lutz Jacobi - PvdA
Tanja Jadnanansing - PvdA
Jan Kees de Jager - CDA
Jan van der Jagt - GPV
Hans Janmaat - KVP - DS'70 - CP / CD
Lilian Janse - SGP
Paulus Jansen - SP
Rik Janssen - SP
Adolf Marcus Joekes - PvdA
Theo Joekes - VVD
Dennis de Jong - SP
Léon de Jong - PVV
Piet de Jong - KVP / CDA
Winny de Jong - LPF
Sjouke Jonker - KVP / CDA
Bonifacius Cornelis de Jonge - CHU
Hugo de Jonge - CDA
Piet Jongeling - ARP - GPV
Jan Anne Jonkman - PvdA
Annemarie Jorritsma-Lebbink - VVD

K
Sigrid Kaag - D66
Ella Kalsbeek - PvdA
Henk Kamp - VVD
Agnes Kant - SP
Jan Kappeyne van de Coppello
Sadet Karabulut - SP
Herman van Karnebeek
Mona Keijzer - CDA
Jos van Kemenade - PvdA
Simone Kennedy-Doornbos - GPV / ChristenUnie
Joke Kersten - PvdA
John Kerstens - PvdA
Piet Kerstens - KVP
Jesse Klaver - GroenLinks
Joram van Klaveren - VVD - PVV
Eelco Nicolaas van Kleffens
Norbert Klein - VVD - 50PLUS
Reinette Klever - PVV
Jetta Klijnsma - PvdA
Ab Klink - CDA
Marga Klompé - KVP / CDA
Cees van der Knaap - CDA
Ben Knapen - CDA
Raymond Knops - CDA
Hendrik Koekoek - CHU - NOU - Boerenpartij / RVP
Bert Koenders - PvdA
Niko Koffeman - SP - Partij voor de Dieren
Wim Kok - PvdA
Hans Kolfschoten - RKSP / KVP
Wim Kolijn - SGP
Maximilien Joseph Caspar Marie Kolkman
Adrianus Antonie Henri Willem König - RKSP
Henk Koning - VVD
Jan de Koning - ARP / CDA
Nine Kooiman - SP
Pieter Kooijmans - ARP / CDA
Dionysius Adrianus Petrus Norbertus Koolen - RKSP
Wouter Koolmees - D66
Bram Koopman - PvdA
Ger Koopmans - CDA
Ad Koppejan - CDA
Rudolf de Korte - VVD
Wim Kortenoeven - PVV - independent
Rad Kortenhorst - RKSP / KVP
Benk Korthals - VVD
Henk Korthals - LSP / PvdV / VVD
Frits Korthals Altes - VVD
Fatma Koşer Kaya - D66
Aad Kosto - PvdA
Hans de Koster - VVD
Tiny Kox - SP
Jacob Kraus - Liberale Unie
Sjeng Kremers - KVP / CDA
Ralf Krewinkel - PvdA
Neelie Kroes - VVD
Henk Krol - VVD - 50+
Paul de Krom - VVD
Roelof Kruisinga - CHU / CDA
Attje Kuiken - PvdA
Roel Kuiper - RPF / ChristenUnie
Abraham Kuyper - ARP
Tunahan Kuzu - PvdA - DENK

L
Jan ter Laan - SDAP
Medy van der Laan - D66
Roelof van Laar - PvdA
Yvette Laclé - RPF / ChristenUnie - no party affiliation
Joost Lagendijk - PSP / GroenLinks
Flora Lagerwerf-Vergunst - RPF / ChristenUnie
Ineke Lambers-Hacquebard - D66
Esther de Lange - CDA
Jeroen de Lange - PvdA
Pierre Lardinois - KVP
René Leegte - VVD
Joan Leemhuis-Stout - VVD
Meindert Leerling - ARP - RPF / ChristenUnie
Gerd Leers - CDA
Gerardus van der Leeuw - SDAP / PvdA
Hannie van Leeuwen - ARP / CDA
Renske Leijten - SP
Cornelis Lely
Piet Lieftinck - SDAP / PvdA - DS70
Otto Cornelis Adriaan van Lidth de Jeude - LSP
Bart de Liefde - VVD
Roald van der Linde - VVD
René van der Linden - CDA
Robin Linschoten - VVD
Kartika Liotard - SP - no party affiliation
Pieter Litjens - VVD
Helma Lodders - VVD
Johannes Servaas Lotsy
Janneke Louisa - ChristenUnie
André van der Louw - PvdA
Ruud Lubbers - CDA
Anne-Wil Lucas - VVD
Eric Lucassen - PVV
Ruud Luchtenveld - VVD
Kees Luesink - GroenLinks
Joseph Luns - KVP
Theo van Lynden van Sandenburg - conservatief

M
Johannes Henricus van Maarseveen - KVP
Nol Maassen - PvdA
Albert Jan Maat - CDA
Jules Maaten - VVD
Æneas Mackay jr. - antirevolutionair / onafhankelijk a.r. / ARP
Barry Madlener - Leefbaar Rotterdam - PVV
Marit Maij - PvdA
Hanja Maij-Weggen - ARP / CDA
Toine Manders - VVD
Sicco Mansholt - SDAP / PvdA
Wilma Mansveld - PvdA
Ahmed Marcouch - PvdA
Johannes Christiaan de Marez Oyens - ARP
Victor Marijnen - KVP / CDA
Jan Marijnissen - SP
Lilian Marijnissen - SP
Maria Martens - CDA
Edith Mastenbroek - PvdA
Paul van Meenen - D66
Theo de Meester - Liberale Unie
Erik Meijer - PvdA - PSP / GroenLinks - SP
Wim Meijer - PSP
Wim Meijer - PvdA
Ad Melkert - PvdA
Hendrik Menso
Arnold Merkies - SP
Judith Merkies - PvdA
Jan Mertens - KVP
Harm van der Meulen - ARP / CDA
Anja Meulenbelt - PSP - SP
Jo Meynen - ARP
Eimert van Middelkoop - GPV / ChristenUnie
Hans van Mierlo - D66
Evert van Milligen - VVD
Anouchka van Miltenburg - VVD
Anthony Ewoud Jan Modderman - liberaal
Mohammed Mohandis - PvdA
Joost Möller - VVD
Jacques Monasch - PvdA
Hubertus van Mook - no party affiliation
Richard de Mos - PVV
Agnes Mulder - CDA
Anne Mulder - VVD
Ineke Mulder - PvdA
Jan Mulder - VVD
Hendrik Mulderije - CHU
Joannes Josephus van Mulken - Thorbeckiaan

N
Jan Nagel - PvdA - Leefbaar Hilversum, Leefbaar Nederland - Partij voor Rechtvaardigheid, Daadkracht en Vooruitgang - 50+
Hilbrand Nawijn - CDA - LPF
Lambertus Neher
Helma Neppérus - VVD
Tineke Netelenbos - PvdA
Atzo Nicolaï - VVD
Hendrik Nienhuis
Jeltje van Nieuwenhoven - PvdA
Cora van Nieuwenhuizen - VVD
Henk Nijboer - PvdA
Henk Nijhof - GroenLinks
Ed Nijpels - VVD
Lambert van Nistelrooij - CDA
Aad Nuis - D66
Erwin Nypels - D66

O
Bram van Ojik - PPR / GroenLinks
Kajsa Ollongren - D66
Pieter Omtzigt - CDA
David van Ooijen - PvdA
Ria Oomen - KVP / CDA
Astrid Oosenbrug - PvdA
Foort van Oosten - VVD
Gerrit Oosting - PvdA
Ivo Opstelten - VVD
Henk Jan Ormel - CDA
Bastiaan Ort - independent liberal
Cynthia Ortega - ChristenUnie
Peter Oskam - CDA
Hans Oskamp - PvdA
Pieter Adrianus Ossewaarde
Gonny van Oudenallen - VVD - LPF - Groep Van Oudenallen; Mokum Mobiel
Rob Oudkerk - PvdA
Esther Ouwehand - Partij voor de Dieren
Selçuk Öztürk - PvdA - DENK

P
Annemiek Padt-Jansen - PvdA
Arie Pais - VVD
Marco Pastors - Livable Rotterdam, One NL  
Jacob Adriaan Nicolaas Patijn
Schelto Patijn - PvdA
Alexander Pechtold - D66
Ruth Peetoom - CDA
Rinus Peijnenburg - KVP / CDA
Karla Peijs - CDA
Bram Peper - PvdA
Mariko Peters - GroenLinks
Nicolaas Pierson - Liberale Unie
Cornelis Pijnacker Hordijk
Inez Pijnenburg - VVD
Tom Pitstra - PSP / GroenLinks
Caroline van der Plas - CDA - BBB
Ronald Plasterk - PvdA
Thomas Bastiaan Pleyte - VDB
Lilianne Ploumen - GroenLinks - PvdA
Han Polman - D66
Joop Post - CDA
Folkert Posthuma
Sjoerd Potters - VVD
Jan Willem de Pous - CHU
Nicki Pouw-Verweij - FVD - no party affiliation - JA21
Jan Pronk - PvdA
Maartje van Putten - PvdA

Q
Jan de Quay - KVP / CDA

R
Ronald van Raak - SP
Jean Jacques Rambonnet
Anthony Gerhard Alexander van Rappard
Frederik van Rappard
Jeroen Recourt - PvdA
Gerlach Cornelis Joannes van Reenen
Louis Hubert Willem Regout - RKSP
Joop van der Reijden - CHU / CDA
Patricia Remak - PvdA - VVD - no party affiliation
Johan Remkes - VVD
Jos van Rey - VVD
Harm van Riel - PvdV / VVD
Koos Rietkerk - VVD
Martin van Rijn - PvdA
Dirk Rijnders - CHU
Hedzer Rijpstra - CHU
Jan Rijpstra - VVD
Johan Ringers
Pieter Rink - Liberale Unie
Alexander Rinnooy Kan  - D66
Jo Ritzen - PvdA
Roel Robbertsen - CDA
Jan Jacob Rochussen
Willem Frederik Rochussen
Emile Roemer - SP
Hein Roethof - VVD - PvdA
Michel Rog - CDA
Frans Ronnes - CDA
Max Rood - D66
Bauke Roolvink - ARP
Raymond de Roon - PVV
Thea de Roos-van Rooden - PvdA
Yvonne van Rooy - CDA
Paul Rosenmöller - GroenLinks
Uri Rosenthal - VVD
Clémence Ross-van Dorp - CDA
Felix Rottenberg - PvdA
André Rouvoet - RPF / ChristenUnie
Sander de Rouwe - CDA
Onno Ruding - CDA
Charles Ruijs de Beerenbrouck - RKSP
Job de Ruiter - CDA
Lo de Ruiter
Arno Rutte - VVD
Mark Rutte - VVD
Peter Johannes Rutten - RKSP
Theo Rutten - KVP

S
Erdinç Saçan - PvdA
Ivo Samkalden - PvdA
Diederik Samsom - PvdA
Jolande Sap - GroenLinks
Judith Sargentini - GroenLinks
Maan Sassen - KVP
Alexander de Savornin Lohman - CHU
Marietje Schaake - D66
Afke Schaart - VVD
Josef van Schaik - RKSP / KVP
Steef van Schaik - RKSP / KVP
Maarten Schakel jr. - CDA
Maarten Schakel sr. - ARP / CDA
Peter Schalk - SGP
Hajé Schartman - KVP / CDA
Wim Schermerhorn - PvdA
Willem Anne Schimmelpenninck van der Oye
Edith Schippers - VVD
Norbert Schmelzer - KVP / CDA
Paul Schnabel - D66
Milo Schoenmaker - VVD
Jan Schokking - CHU
Wim Schokking - CHU
Jan Nico Scholten - ARP / CDA - no party affiliation - PvdA
Willem Scholten  - CHU
Ynso Scholten - CHU / CDA
Carola Schouten - ChristenUnie
Gerard Schouw - D66
Johanna Frederika Schouwenaar-Franssen - VVD
Annie Schreijer-Pierik - CDA
Bertram Johannes Otto Schrieke
Melanie Schultz van Haegen - VVD
Anoushka Schut-Welkzijn - VVD
Dick Schutte - RPF / ChristenUnie
Gert Schutte - GPV / ChristenUnie
Egbert Schuurman - RPF / ChristenUnie
Wil Schuurman - CPN - PvdA - CP / CD
Gert-Jan Segers - RPF / ChristenUnie
Michiel Servaes - PvdA
James Sharpe - PVV
Oene Sierksma - RPF / ChristenUnie
Sylvana Simons - DENK - BIJ1
Hannie Singer-Dekker - PvdA
Sjoerd Wiemer Sjoerdsma - D66
Marcus Slingenberg
Arie Slob - GPV / ChristenUnie
Gerard Slotemaker de Bruïne - SDAP / PvdA - PSP
Jan Rudolph Slotemaker de Bruïne - CHU
Eric Smaling - SP
Jan Smallenbroek - ARP
Pauline Smeets - PvdA
Hendrik Jan Smidt
Margreeth Smilde - CDA
Joke Smit - PvdA
Manja Smits - SP
Janneke Snijder-Hazelhoff - VVD
Pangeran Adipati Soejono
Haya van Someren - VVD
Ronald Sørensen - PvdA - Leefbaar Rotterdam, Leefbaar Zuid-Holland, EénNL, PVV
Winnie Sorgdrager - D66 - VVD - D66
Hans Spekman - PvdA
Liesbeth Spies - CDA
Derk Gerard Willem Spitzen
Kees van der Staaij - SGP
Boele Staal - D66
Kees Staf - CHU
Laurence Stassen - PVV
Fons van der Stee - KVP
Max Steenberghe - RKSP / KVP
Dick Stellingwerf - RPF / ChristenUnie
Bram Stemerdink - PvdA
Mirjam Sterk - CDA
Ard van der Steur - VVD
Petra Stienen - D66
Dirk Stikker - LSP - VVD
Max van der Stoel - PvdA
Daniël van der Stoep - CDA - PVV
Kick Stokhuyzen - VVD
Karin Straus - VVD
Martin Pascal Hubert Strens
Ton Strien - CDA
Antoon Arnold Marie Struycken - KVP
Olaf Stuger - LPF
Louis Stuyt - KVP
Ko Suurhoff - SDAP / PvdA

T
Johannes Pieter Roetert Tak van Poortvliet
Syb Talma - ARP
Grace Tanamal - PvdA
Marja van der Tas - CDA
Joost Taverne - VVD
Fred Teeven - VVD - Leefbaar Nederland - VVD
Ockje Tellegen - VVD
Jan van den Tempel - SDAP
Jan Terlouw - D66
Erica Terpstra - VVD
Jacob George Hieronymus van Tets van Goudriaan
Christine Teunissen - PvdD
Frans-Joseph van Thiel - KVP
Marianne Thieme - Partij voor de Dieren
Ed van Thijn - PvdA
Tof Thissen - PvdA - PSP / GroenLinks
Johan Rudolph Thorbecke - liberaal
Jacques Tichelaar - PvdA
Yvonne Timmerman-Buck - CDA
Frans Timmermans - D66 - PvdA
Teun Tolman - CHU / CDA
Dick Tommel - D66
Lodewijk Thomson - Liberal Union
Liesbeth van Tongeren - GroenLinks
Willem den Toom - VVD
Madeleine van Toorenburg - CDA
Edzo Toxopeus - VVD
Willem Treub - VDB
Boy Trip - PPR
Theodoor Philibert Tromp
Danny Tuijnman - VVD
Liesbeth Tuijnman - VVD
Sammy van Tuyll van Serooskerken - VVD - LibDem

U
Berend Jan Udink - CHU
Sabine Uitslag - CDA
Paul Ulenbelt - SP
Joop den Uyl - PvdA

V
Chris van Veen - CHU / CDA
Eelke van der Veen - PvdA
Michiel van Veen - VVD
Cees Veerman - CDA
Joris in 't Veld - SDAP / PvdA
Sophie in 't Veld - D66
Stientje van Veldhoven - D66
Marlies Veldhuijzen van Zanten-Hyllner - CDA
Gerard Veldkamp - KVP
Kars Veling - GPV / ChristenUnie
Tamara Venrooy-van Ark - VVD
Leen Verbeek - PvdA
Gerdi Verbeet - PvdA
Bart Verbrugh - ARP - GPV
Gerda Verburg - CDA
Co Verdaas - PvdA
Pieter Verdam - ARP
Rita Verdonk - VVD
Edgar Frederik Marie Justin Michiels van Verduynen
Maxime Verhagen - CDA
Mark Verheijen - VVD
Kees Verhoeven - D66
Nico Verlaan - VVD - Veilig Verkeer en 100.000 woningen per jaar - Boerenpartij - Lijst-Van Velsen
Willem Vermeend - PvdA
Roos Vermeij - PvdA
Hermanus Eliza Verschoor - liberaal
Timotheus Josephus Verschuur - RKSP
Annelies Verstand - D66
Alfred Vierling - CP / CD / Nederlands Blok
Tom Viezee - RPF / ChristenUnie
Jan Vis - D66
Barbara Visser - VVD
Cornelis Visser - CDA
Henk Visser - RPF / ChristenUnie
Piet de Visser - PvdA - GroenLinks
Margo Vliegenthart - PvdA
Bas van der Vlies - SGP
Roland van Vliet - PVV
Stefanie van Vliet - D66
Ella Vogelaar - PvdA
Cornelis Vollenhoven
Anne Vondeling - PvdA
Henk Vonhoff - VVD
Joël Voordewind - PvdA - ChristenUnie
Joris Voorhoeve - VVD
Linda Voortman - GroenLinks
Irene Vorrink - PvdA
Hendrik Vos - SDAP / PvdA
Jan Vos - PvdA
Marijke Vos - GroenLinks
Mei Li Vos - PvdA
Henk Vredeling - PvdA
Steven de Vreeze - PvdA
Albert de Vries - PvdA
Aukje de Vries - VVD
Bert de Vries - CDA
Jack de Vries - CDA
Jannewietske de Vries - PvdA
Jurn de Vries - GPV / ChristenUnie
Klaas de Vries - PvdA
Theun de Vries - CPN
Maarten Vrolijk - PvdA
Agnites Vrolik - conservatief
Ronald Vuijk - VVD

W
Leen van der Waal - SGP
Jan Hendrik de Waal Malefijt - ARP
Aad Wagenaar - ARP - RPF - Groep Wagenaar / AR'85
Jacques Wallage - PvdA
Frans Weekers - VVD
Tymon de Weger - GPV / ChristenUnie
Frans Weisglas - VVD
Marieke van der Werf - CDA
Aucke van der Werff - CDA
Tjerk Westerterp -  KVP / CDA
Steven van Weyenberg - D66
Meindert Wiardi Beckman - conservatief
Eric Wiebes - VVD
Hans Wiegel - VVD
Esmé Wiegman - RPF / ChristenUnie
Jan Marinus Wiersma - PvdA
Hans Wijers - D66
Frans Wijffels - RKSP / KVP
Joop Wijn - CDA
David Wijnkoop - SDAP - SDP / CPH / CPN
Harry Wijnschenk - LPF
Geert Wilders - VVD - PVV
Pieter Winsemius - VVD
Bart van Winsen - CDA
Jan de Wit - SP
Herman Witte - KVP
Johan Witteveen - VVD
Pieter van Woensel - VVD
Agnes Wolbert - PvdA
Frans Wolters - KVP / CDA
Thijs Wöltgens - PvdA
Corien Wortmann - CDA
Bas van 't Wout - VVD

Y
Gerrit Ybema - D66
Loes Ypma - PvdA
Keklik Yücel - PvdA

Z
Gerrit Zalm - PvdA - VVD
Jan van Zanen - VVD
Dick de Zeeuw - KVP - PvdA
Friso de Zeeuw - PvdA
Henk Zeevalking - D66
Piet van Zeil - KVP / CDA
Erik Ziengs - VVD
Halbe Zijlstra - VVD
Jelle Zijlstra - ARP / CDA
Jacob van Zuylen van Nijevelt
Julius van Zuylen van Nijevelt - Groenianen

References 
 Relevant articles of Dutch politicians on Wikipedia.